William Warden (1761 – March 18, 1786) was a printer in late 18th-century Boston, Massachusetts. In March 1784, when Warden was 23 years of age, he established the Massachusetts Centinel newspaper, with Benjamin Russell. The printing-office of Warden & Russell was located in March 1784 "at the southeast corner of State House" in Boston, and later moved to 9 Marlborough Street. The publishing partnership continued until Warden's death in 1786. Warden never married. He died "after a lingering illness" at age 25, and was interred in the Granary Burying Ground.

References 

American newspaper publishers (people)
Businesspeople from Boston
1761 births
1786 deaths
18th century in Boston
Burials at Granary Burying Ground
People of colonial Massachusetts